Gary Fayard (born 1953) is a former chief financial officer and executive vice president of The Coca-Cola Company. He was with the company 20 years, 15 as CFO. He is a 1975 graduate of the University of Alabama, where he was a brother of the Sigma Nu fraternity.

After retiring, Fayard created a Black Angus cattle farm in Tennessee.

In 2019, Fayard was inducted into the Alabama Business Hall of Fame.

Awards and recognition
In 2013, AdvisoryCloud ranked Gary Fayard as the #15 CFO on their Top Financing Executive List.

Board memberships

References

External links
 Profile at reuters.com
 "The Coca Cola Company" on Google Finance
 Coca-Cola biography

1953 births
Living people
American chief financial officers
Coca-Cola people
University of Alabama alumni
Year of birth uncertain
20th-century American businesspeople